Oliver Walther (born 28 October 1972) is a German gymnast. He competed at the 1992 Summer Olympics and the 1996 Summer Olympics.

References

External links
 

1972 births
Living people
German male artistic gymnasts
Olympic gymnasts of Germany
Gymnasts at the 1992 Summer Olympics
Gymnasts at the 1996 Summer Olympics
Sportspeople from Halle (Saale)